Jad Shwery (usually spelled: Jad Choueiri;   Lebanese pronunciation: , born 13 March 1980) is a Lebanese pop singer, songwriter, producer and music video director.

Musical career

Right after his university years in ALBA academie libanaise des beaux-arts and La Sorbonne Nouvelle Paris 3, Jad participated in The Studio El Fan contest of 2002 and won the first prize in the directing category for the music video he directed of "Ya Mustafa" by Reeda Butros. 
In 2004, Jad wrote his first song "aollak eh" and shot its video. The song was a strong club hit that flew to the top of many charts around the Arab world. Jad's success caused some controversy because of the new style it introduced but many doors opened for him as he was asked to direct some videos as well as produce and write other artists' records. But most importantly Jad got offered a record deal by Melody music and became managed by Melody artist management.

His follow-up record "Oully Ezay" proved to be an even bigger hit, and Jad started performing all over the Arab world. His first album El Mouftah came next, gathering all the previous hits along with "Banadeelak" that took the Arabic charts by storm. His biggest hit was yet to come. "Warrini", a duet with Malak el Nasser became one of the most popular songs of 2006 in many countries in the middle east. He has introduced many things to the Arabic pop industry as he was the first male artist to do a choreographed dance during his performances or put Arabic rapping into the mainstream.

In April 2009, Jad released his single "Funky Arabs" to be the first single off his English album. The controversy regarding the video has been running ever since, especially on YouTube, but it did not stop the video from being broadcast on BNN in the Netherlands, as well as being selected in the Arab film festival in Parramatta, New South Wales, Australia. Later on that year he released "Wala Awel" followed up by "Ghaly" as the first songs from his second Arabic album. The video was shot in Paris, London, New York and Disneyland with the help of Jad's brother and sister Ralph and Ingrid Choueiri.
Although he was continuously criticized for his limited vocal capabilities, even the most skeptic detractors had to acknowledge the successful performances he gave around the MENA. His two concerts in Casablanca – Morocco on the 15 and 16 July that year gathered 40,000 people on the first night and 70,000 on the second. On 26 August 2011 "Kassaretly El Siyara"(his first official release in the Lebanese dialect) was released along with a music video that featured a new dabke dance style highlighting the electronic break beat of the song. It helped the song become a success and promote the upcoming album. On 13 September, Jad released his second album, Eshha Keda which was co-produced by Melody and Mira stars. He performed the album at the Riviera Hotel on 14 September, along with all his previous hits and some covers, in a rock-solid and modern choreographed show which was attended by a big number of local celebrities. "Mesh ayez gherak" and "Eshha Keda" were the following singles but failed to get the hype of the first release from that album. The Arab Spring in Egypt was primarily the reason behind that – especially that Melody itself had closed its doors. In 2013 Jad released an English song called "we don't care" that was popular on the club scene and in English speaking circles. In 2015, Jad decided to get back to the front of the music scene with a new vision of his persona: more of a producer/performer with collaborating artists than the classical pop singer. The result was "Agaza", a powerful duet with Egypt's big rising star Pousy. The song, written by Jad, flew to the top of the charts in most Arab countries and re-established Jad as a pop phenomenon. The "Best contemporary artist" award he received at the Murex d'or that year is a solid proof of the impact of his comeback. Several collaborations followed like "Barra" with Hind Al Bahrainia (2017) and "Ma fish keda" with Lola Jaffan (2018) erasing the line between his persona as a director/producer and performer.

Direction and production career

The first video that turned Jad into a star director, capable of transforming any product into a phenomenon, was undoubtedly "Elaab"  by Maria. Many new artists have asked Jad to direct their videos or produce their records since. But Jad remained in a certain style of entertaining, sometime controversial type of videos until he completely changed that image with Joanna Mallah's "Hatefdal fi Albi". "Wala fi el ahlam" by Iwan "bahibak awi"  by Nicole Saba and "Bartah Maak" by Amr Mostafa followed and established Jad as a romantic music video director as well. Jad's reputation as a "starmaker" lead production house Endemol to ask him to be one of the jury producers in a talent show contest on Abu Dhabi TV in 2008.

In 2010 Jad's directing career took a turning point. After working with artists like Micheline khalife, Dina Hayek and Fella, he was chosen to direct the first solo video of the legendary icon Wadih el Safi. The music video gained both critics and viewers respect. In 2012 Jad directed megastars Diana Haddad and Nawal el zoghbi's new videos. Both were unanimously successful, "gharibi hal denyi"  by Nawal Al Zoghbi counting around 4million YouTube hits (a couple of months after its release).

Jad stayed away from the music scene for a while, concentrating on his career as a producer/director and worked with big pop stars in the likes of Yara Cyrine Abdelnour, Nassif Zeytoun,

Video clips

Directed by Jad Shwery

Discography

2005: El Moftah 
2011: Eshha Keda 
Independent Singles: ''Warriny, Masria, Funky Arabs, Stop popping pills, We don't care, Agaza"

References

Living people
1980 births
Lebanese musicians
Lebanese pop singers
Lebanese music video directors
Lebanese male film actors
Lebanese male television actors